The Grenadian passport is a travel document issued to citizens of Grenada, in accordance with the Grenadian Citizenship Act of 1976 (Cap 54) and the Grenada Constitution, for the purpose of facilitating international travel. It allows the bearer to travel to foreign countries and the Commonwealth of Nations, in accordance with visa requirements, and facilitates the process of securing assistance from Grenadian consular officials abroad, if necessary.

A Grenadian passport is a document valid for proof of citizenship. The passport is also a CARICOM passport, as Grenada is a member of the Caribbean Community. There are three types of passport booklets: regular, service, and diplomatic. Despite the placement of the Caribbean Community (CARICOM) logo at the top of the document's front cover, Grenadian passports are issued by the Immigration and Passport Department (an extension arm of the Royal Grenada Police Force) and at the diplomatic missions and honorary consulates of Grenada abroad.

Types of passports

Regular Grenadian citizens are eligible to a apply for a passport.

Diplomatic Issued to Grenadian diplomats accredited overseas and their eligible dependents and citizens who reside in Grenada and travel abroad for diplomatic work. The Governor-General of Grenada, the Prime Minister of Grenada, the Foreign Minister of Grenada, as well as other Government Ministers are also eligible for a diplomatic passport.

Application

All applicants aged 16 or above are entitled to apply for a standard Grenadian passport. 

Children under age of 16 years must have written consent from their parent/legal guardian when applying for a passport.

In case of a lost/stolen/damaged passport, a Grenadian citizen must provide an affidavit declaration and a police report accompanying that application.
  
Passport fees (Effective from the 1st of November 2019).

Standard
 Passport Renewal; First-time e-Passport Applicant, US$250
 Lost/stolen/damaged; Renewal of Valid e-Passport (e.g. Change of Name), US$500

Emergency Travel Document to Grenada 
 Travel document, US$35

Grenadian passports may also be issued outside Grenada, for which fees vary per country.

Format

Paper size B7 (ISO/IEC 7810 ID-3, 88 mm × 125 mm)
36 pages

Cover

Grenadian e-passports are dark blue in colour, with the logo of CARICOM and the words CARIBBEAN COMMUNITY, followed by GRENADA, inscribed at the top of the front cover. The Grenadian coat of arms is prominently emblazoned in the centre of the front cover, followed by the inscription of the words PASSPORT, on ordinary passports; OFFICIAL PASSPORT, on official passports; and DIPLOMATIC PASSPORT, on diplomatic passports at the bottom.

Biodata page

The following information is printed on the biodata page, in: English and French.

{|
|-
|3. Type (PA for passport)
|4. Country Code (GRD)
|-
|5. Passport Number
|6. Surname
|-
|7. Given names
|8. Nationality (Grenadian)
|-
|9. Date of birth
|11. Sex
|-
|12. Place of birth
|14. Date of issue
|-
|15. Issuing office
|16. Date of expiry
|-
|18. Holder's signature
|19. Holder's Portrait 
|}

Passport photographs

The standards are:
 Not more than 2 1/2in x 2in or less than 2in x 1 1/2in.
 No glasses.
 No bands visible.
 No big earrings.
 Ears must be visible.
 Hair must be away from face and not covering the forehead.
 Chest must be covered.

Passport statement

Grenadian passports contain on their inside cover the following words in English only:

Visa requirements for Grenadian citizens

 Grenadian citizens had visa-free or visa on arrival access (including eTAs) to 146 countries and territories, ranking the Grenadian passport 33rd in the world in terms of travel freedom (tied with the Mauritian passport) according to the Henley Passport Index.

Grenadian citizens can live and work within the OECS as a result of the right of free movement and residence granted in Article 12 of the Revised Treaty of Basseterre.

On 28 May 2015, Grenada signed a short-stay visa waiver agreement with the European Union.

This agreement allows citizens of Grenada to visit the countries of Europe who are members of the Schengen Area for up to 90 days within any 180-day period without a visa. Similarly, citizens of Europe (whose countries are members of the Schengen Area) will be able to visit Grenada for the same period without a visa.

Gallery of historical images

See also

 Visa requirements for Grenadian citizens
 CARICOM passport
 Grenadian nationality law
 Monarchy of Grenada
 Government of Grenada
 Commonwealth citizen
 Foreign relations of Grenada

References

Grenada and the Commonwealth of Nations
Grenada
Government of Grenada
Law of Grenada